The 2015 CampingWorld.com 500 was a NASCAR Sprint Cup Series race that was held on March 15, 2015, at Phoenix International Raceway in Avondale, Arizona. Contested over 312 laps on the  asphalt oval, it was the fourth race of the 2015 NASCAR Sprint Cup Series season. Kevin Harvick won the race, his second of the season, while Jamie McMurray finished second. Ryan Newman, Kasey Kahne and Kurt Busch rounded out the top five.

Harvick won the pole for the race and led a race high of 224 laps, en route to a 30th career victory and his seventh at Phoenix. The race had eight lead changes among four different drivers, as well as ten caution flag periods for 53 laps.

Recording the fourth win at the track for Stewart-Haas Racing, Harvick increased his points lead over Joey Logano to 22. Chevrolet increased their lead over Ford to 20 points in the manufacturers' standings.

The CampingWorld.com 500 was carried by Fox Sports on the broadcast Fox network for the American television audience. The radio broadcast of the race was carried by the Motor Racing Network and Sirius XM NASCAR Radio.

Report

Background

Phoenix International Raceway, also known as PIR, is a one-mile, low-banked tri-oval race track located in Avondale, Arizona. The motorsport track opened in 1964 and currently hosts two NASCAR race weekends annually. PIR has also hosted the IndyCar Series, CART, USAC and the Rolex Sports Car Series. The raceway is currently owned and operated by International Speedway Corporation.

Kevin Harvick entered Phoenix with a nine-point lead over Dale Earnhardt Jr. following his win the week before at Las Vegas. Joey Logano entered eleven points back of Harvick in third, with Martin Truex Jr. a further five points back in fourth. A. J. Allmendinger entered 34 points back in fifth.

New inspection rule
Following the inspection issues during qualifying at Atlanta Motor Speedway two weeks prior, NASCAR implemented a new technical inspection rule from Phoenix onwards. Instead of teams rolling through the laser inspection platform multiple times until passing, they will now only get two attempts to pass without consequence. Should they fail both times, the car will be forced to sit on pit road for 15 minutes in the next practice session before being allowed to go on track. Also, if a car fails its first attempt, it must wait until all the other cars have gone through the station at least once.

Entry list

The entry list for the CampingWorld.com 500 was released on Monday, March 9, 2015 at 10:16 a.m. Eastern time. Forty-seven drivers were entered for the race, but was reduced to 46 after Ron Hornaday Jr. and The Motorsports Group withdrew from the event. This was further reduced to 45 after Reed Sorenson's RAB Racing Toyota withdrew. Team owner Robby Benton stated that the team had "no need to chase points" and that "after missing Las Vegas, it made sense to skip Phoenix and take the added time to better prepare for California". All 45 who were entered at Las Vegas, except for Ryan Blaney, Ty Dillon and Michael McDowell, were entered for Phoenix. The only car with a different driver was Tanner Berryhill – making his Sprint Cup début – driving in place of Mike Wallace in the No. 66 Premium Motorsports Chevrolet. Alex Kennedy was named the driver of the No. 33 Hillman-Circle Sport LLC Chevrolet. On Wednesday, March 11, NASCAR reinstated Kurt Busch and cleared him to return to active driving. As a result, he retook his No. 41 Chevrolet that has been driven by Regan Smith the last three races. In a statement, Busch stated that he understood "why NASCAR needed to take the action that it did", while also stating that "the important factor is that what I was accused of was a complete fabrication, and I never wavered through this whole process because of the confidence in the truth, and I had the support from Gene Haas and everybody at SHR, and that's where my focus has been".

First practice
Kurt Busch making his first start since returning from a three-week suspension, was 17th fastest with a time of 26.222 and a speed .

Qualifying

He commented that he felt Phoenix International Raceway "is a pretty special place [...] for the fact that [he and his family] used to bring [their] Southwest Tour cars here and [their] Winston West cars" and that it was "pretty special to be a part of a group of guys like this". Third place qualifier Jamie McMurray felt that he did "everything perfect, but ended up 0.060 seconds behind Harvick". He was delighted to "get back in the seat and shake hands with all the guys" and that "the car seems fast".

Qualifying results

Practice (post-qualifying)

Second practice

Final practice
A. J. Allmendinger changed engines during this session and was forced to start from the rear. Allmendinger commented that his JTG Daugherty Racing team "saw something they didn't like" and that they "have just got to make the Kingsford Chevy better". Allmendinger's crew chief, Brian Burns, stated that the team "didn't qualify as well as we wanted to anyway, so we decided to take the opportunity to change it now and eliminate any doubts" and that they were "just taking some precautionary measures to make sure we are good to go to the end".

Race

First-half
The race was scheduled to start at 3:45 p.m. but started three minutes later and Kevin Harvick led the field to the green. However, he did not lead the first lap as Joey Logano, on the inside line, passed him to lead the first lap. Coming to the line, Brian Vickers was turned into the wall by Jimmie Johnson, destroying the wheel axle of Vickers' car and he hit the wall in turn 1, bringing out the race's first caution period. Upon exiting his car in the garage, Vickers stated that it was "a shame" to hit the wall, and pointed out that, in his opinion, it was "kind of early to be using the bumper". The race restarted on lap six with Logano leading the way. It ran green for another ten laps before the second caution of the race flew for Alex Kennedy cutting down a tire and spinning in turn 4.

The race restarted on lap 20, with Logano and Harvick battling for the lead. Logano held the lead until lap 25, when Harvick re-assumed first place. Harvick led the next segment of the race, and on lap 49, he led his one-thousandth lap in races at Phoenix International Raceway, the most of any driver. Debris in turn 1 brought out the third caution on lap 67. Denny Hamlin was forced to drop to the tail end of the field for his crew being over the wall too soon. The race restarted on lap 72, and over the course of the following 30 laps, Harvick pulled out to a 2.5-second lead over Logano. The fourth caution of the race flew on lap 117 after Sam Hornish Jr. had a right-rear tire blowout and spun out on the backstretch. Brad Keselowski took just two tires and exited pit road with the lead, while Dale Earnhardt Jr. dropped to the tail end of the field, after he was caught speeding on pit road. The race restarted on lap 126. Kevin Harvick restarted the race eighth and drove his way back to second by lap 157.

Second-half

Restart after Caution 4
Harvick finally caught Keselowski and passed him for the lead on lap 172. The fifth caution of the race flew on lap 181 when Earnhardt Jr. blew his right-rear tire and backed into the wall in turn 2. Earnhardt stated that his car was "really, really loose today and just wore the right rear tire out, and blew the tire". He drove his car to his pit stall while leaving a trail of fuel along the way, keeping pit road closed for six laps for clean up. Logano exited pit road with the lead thanks to taking two tires, while Matt Kenseth dropped to the rear of the field, after he was caught speeding. The race restarted on lap 192, and once again, Logano and Harvick duked it out for the race lead. Logano maintained the lead until lap 199, when Harvick's four-tire pit strategy allowed him to take the lead, just before the sixth caution of the race flew for debris on the front stretch. The race restarted on lap 205, before debris in the dogleg brought out the seventh caution of the race with 86 laps to go.

Trouble for Tony Stewart
The race restarted with 79 laps to go, but just as the field headed into turn 4, Tony Stewart spun out and hit the wall, bringing out the eighth caution. The race restarted with 71 laps to go, and Kurt Busch tried to keep with Stewart-Haas Racing teammate Harvick, but Harvick maintained station at the head of the race. The ninth caution of the race flew with 24 laps to go when Stewart had a right-front tire blowout and hit the wall exiting turn 4, and collected Hornish. Nine drivers – including Harvick – opted not to pit while Busch and Jeff Gordon did. The race restarted with 17 laps to go, but the yellow flag flew – for the tenth time – before a lap could be completed, when Danica Patrick came down on David Ragan and got turned in turn 4.

Finish
The race restarted with twelve laps to go and Harvick drove away from the field to score his seventh victory at the track.

Post-race

Driver comments
Harvick stated that Phoenix "is a really special place of all these West Coast races for us to win" while stating that his car was "incredible and really fun to drive". Kurt Busch scored a top five finish in his first start of the season, stating he has "a strong team, and personally, it's great to get back to them", while also expressing that "the way we raced today was with heart".

Race results

Race statistics
8 lead changes among 4 different drivers
10 cautions for 53 laps
Time of race: 2 hours, 57 minutes, 1 second
Average speed: 
Kevin Harvick took home $263,090 in winnings

Race awards
 Coors Light Pole Award: Kevin Harvick (25.577)
 3M Lap Leader: Kevin Harvick (224 laps)
 American Ethanol Green Flag Restart Award: Kevin Harvick (27.854 )
 Duralast Brakes "Brake in The Race" Award: Joey Logano
 Freescale "Wide Open": Kurt Busch
 Ingersoll Rand Power Move: Paul Menard, 4 positions
 MAHLE Clevite Engine Builder of the Race: Hendrick Engines, #4
 Mobil 1 Driver of the Race: Kevin Harvick (150.0 driver rating (perfect driver rating))
 Moog Steering and Suspension Problem Solver of The Race: Kurt Busch (crew chief Tony Gibson, 0.087 seconds)
 NASCAR Sprint Cup Leader Bonus: Kevin Harvick ($10,000)
 Sherwin-Williams Fastest Lap: Matt Kenseth (Lap 12, 26.618)
 Sunoco Rookie of The Race: Jeb Burton

Media

Television
Fox Sports covered their eleventh race at the Phoenix International Raceway. Mike Joy, Larry McReynolds, and Darrell Waltrip had the call in the booth for the race. Jamie Little, Chris Neville, and Matt Yocum handled the pit road duties for the television side.

Radio
MRN had the radio call for the race which was also simulcast on Sirius XM NASCAR Radio. Joe Moore, Jeff Striegle, and 1998 race winner Rusty Wallace called the race in the booth when the field was racing down the front stretch. Dan Hubbard called the race from atop the suites that line the turn 1 grandstands when the field was racing through turns 1 and 2. Buddy Long called the race from a scaffold outside turn 4 when the field was racing through turns 3 and 4. Woody Cain, Alex Hayden, Glenn Jarrett, and Kyle Rickey worked pit road for MRN.

Standings after the race

Drivers' Championship standings

Manufacturers' Championship standings

Note: Only the first sixteen positions are included for the driver standings.

Notes

References

CampingWorld.com 500
CampingWorld.com 500
NASCAR races at Phoenix Raceway